Sehetepkare Intef (also known as Intef IV or Intef V) was the twenty-third king of the 13th Dynasty during the Second intermediate period. Sehetepkare Intef reigned from Memphis for a short period, certainly less than ten years, between 1759 BC and 1749 BC or c. 1710 BC.

Attestations
Sehetepkare Intef is attested in the Turin canon, entry 7.22 (Ryholt) or 6.22 (Alan Gardiner, Jürgen von Beckerath). The Turin canon places Sehetepkare Intef between Imyremeshaw and Seth Meribre. Intef is also attested on the Karnak king list. Beyond these documents, Sehetepkare Intef is attested by the lower half of a seated statue from the temple complex of goddess Renenutet at Medinet Madi in the Faiyum. The statue, JE 67834, is now in the Egyptian Museum, Cairo.

Chronological position and reign length 
The exact chronological position of Sehetepkare Intef in the 13th Dynasty is not known for certain owing to uncertainties affecting earlier kings of the dynasty. Darrell Baker places him as the twenty-third king of the dynasty, Kim Ryholt as the twenty-fourth and Jürgen von Beckerath as the nineteenth. Furthermore, Ryholt believes Sehetepkare Intef was the fifth ruler bearing that name, making him Intef V, while Aidan Dodson, von Beckerath and Darrell Baker posit that he was Intef IV.

The length of his reign is lost in a lacuna of the papyrus and cannot be recovered, except for the end of the inscription which reads "...[and] 3 days". Kim Ryholt gives ten years for the combined reigns of Imyremeshaw, Sehetepkare Intef and Seth Meribre. Another piece of evidence concerning the reign of Intef is found in the 13th Dynasty Papyrus Boulaq 18 which reports, among other things, the composition of a royal family comprising ten king's sisters, an unspecified number of king's brothers, three daughters of the king, a son named Redienef and a queen named Aya. Even though the king's name is lost in a lacuna, Ryholt's analysis of the papyrus only leaves Imyremeshaw and Sehetepkare Intef as possibilities. This is significant because the papyrus reports a year 3 and a year 5 dates for this king. Additionally, a date "regnal year 5, 3rd month of Shemu, 18th day" is known from the unfinished pyramid complex neighboring that of Khendjer, which may thus have been built by the same ruler, a close successor of Khendjer, perhaps Intef.

The exact circumstances of the end of Intef's reign are unknown but the fact that his successor Seth Meribre did not use filiative nomina points to a non-royal birth. Consequently, Ryholt proposes that Seth Meribre usurped the throne.

References

18th-century BC Pharaohs
Pharaohs of the Thirteenth Dynasty of Egypt